Ampleforth is a village in North Yorkshire, England.

Ampleforth may also refer to:

Ampleforth Abbey, a Benedictine monastery
Ampleforth College, a coeducational, independent school
Ampleforth railway station, a former railway station
St Martin's Ampleforth, an independent preparatory school
Ampleforth, a character in George Orwell's novel Nineteen Eighty-Four
Ampleforth, formerly Empire Zephyr, a cargo ship operated by Ampleforth Steamship Co. Ltd.